"Misery Loves My Company" is a song by Canadian rock band Three Days Grace, from their fourth studio album Transit of Venus released on May 14, 2013. The track became the band's tenth song to reach number-one on the Billboard Mainstream Rock chart in its November 2, 2013, issue. It is the band's eleventh No. 1 single in total. This was the band's first single to not enter the Billboard Alternative Songs chart. It is the last single to feature Adam Gontier on lead vocals.

Critical reception
AXS.com listed "Misery Loves My Company" as one of the "top 10 best Three Days Grace songs." Patricia Jones of AXS praised singer Adam Gontier's "distinct vocals" and Barry Stock's "crisp guitar solo" on the song.

Music video
The band held a contest for fans to make a music video for the song in which the winner would receive $5,000. The music video was released on September 11, 2013.

Personnel
 Adam Gontier – lead vocals, rhythm guitar
 Brad Walst – bass guitar
 Barry Stock – lead guitar
 Neil Sanderson – drums, backing vocals

Charts

Weekly charts

Year-end charts

References

2012 songs
2013 singles
Three Days Grace songs
Songs written by Adam Gontier